Bartley is a village in Red Willow County, Nebraska, United States. The population was 270 at the 2020 census.

History
Bartley was platted in 1886 when the Chicago, Burlington and Quincy Railroad was extended to that point. It was named for Rev. Allen Bartley, the original owner of the town site.

Geography
Bartley is located at  (40.251500, -100.308163).

Demographics

2010 census
At the 2010 census, there were 283 people, 126 households and 87 families residing in the village. The racial make-up of the village was 98.2% White, 0.7% Native American, 0.7% from other races and 0.4% from two or more races. Hispanic or Latino of any race were 2.8% of the population.

There were 126 households, of which 23.8% had children under the age of 18 living with them, 53.2% were married couples living together, 10.3% had a female householder with no husband present, 5.6% had a male householder with no wife present and 31.0% were non-families. 28.6% of all households were made up of individuals, and 19.9% had someone living alone who was 65 years of age or older. The average household size was 2.25 and the average family size was 2.66.

The median age was 47.4 years. 18.7% of residents were under the age of 18, 10.2% were between the ages of 18 and 24, 16.8% were from 25 to 44, 28.6% were from 45 to 64 and 25.4% were 65 years of age or older. The sex make-up of the village was 45.6% male and 54.4% female.

2000 census
Atf the 2000 census, there were 355 people, 146 households and 107 families residing in the village. The racial make-up of the village was 97.75% White, 1.13% from other races and 1.13% from two or more races. Hispanic or Latino of any race were 2.54% of the population.

There were 146 households, of which 30.8% had children under the age of 18 living with them, 61.6% were married couples living together, 6.8% had a female householder with no husband present and 26.7% were non-families. 26.0% of all households were made up of individuals and 14.4% had someone living alone who was 65 years of age or older. The average household size was 2.43 and the average family size was 2.92.

26.8% of the population were under the age of 18, 7.0% from 18 to 24, 22.5% from 25 to 44, 23.7% from 45 to 64 and 20.0% were 65 years of age or older. The median age was 40 years. For every 100 females, there were 99.4 males. For every 100 females age 18 and over, there were 88.4 males.

The median household income was $31,111 and the median family income was $36,406. Males had a median income of $27,917 and females $22,143. The per capita income was $14,824. About 6.9% of families and 11.4% of the population were below the poverty line, including 22.1% of those under age 18 and 6.6% of those age 65 or over.

References

Villages in Red Willow County, Nebraska
Villages in Nebraska